Rufus Gerrard-Wright, known as Rufus Wright, is an English film, stage and television actor.

Personal life
Wright is the son of Major-General Richard Gerrard-Wright and his wife, Susan (née Young). He is the younger brother of Lance Gerrard-Wright, who was the second husband of television presenter Ulrika Jonsson.

Both brothers attended Lambrook Preparatory School at Winkfield Row in Berkshire. Wright is married to actress Melanie Gutteridge.

Filmography

References

English male film actors
English male stage actors
English male television actors
Living people
Place of birth missing (living people)
Year of birth missing (living people)